These are the official results of the athletics competition at the 1994 Goodwill Games which took place in late July 1994 in Saint Petersburg, Russia.

Men's results

100 meters

200 meters

400 meters

800 meters

Mile

5000 meters

10,000 meters

110 meters hurdles

400 meters hurdles

3000 meters steeplechase

4 x 100 meters relay

4 x 400 meters relay

20,000 meters walk

High jump

Pole vault

Long jump

Triple jump

Shot put

Discus throw

Hammer throw

Javelin throw

Decathlon

Women's results

100 meters

200 meters

400 meters

800 meters

1500 meters

3000 meters

5000 meters

10,000 meters

100 meters hurdles
Wind: +3.8 m/s

400 meters hurdles

2000 meters steeplechase

4 x 100 meters relay

4 x 400 meters relay

10,000 meters walk

High jump

Pole vault

Long jump

Triple jump

Shot put

Discus throw

Javelin throw

Heptathlon

References

1994
Goodwill Games